Marcy Lynn Walker (born November 26, 1961), also known as Marcy Smith, is an American youth minister and former actress known for her television appearances on daytime soap operas. Her most famous roles are those of Liza Colby on All My Children, which she played from 1981 to 1984 and 1995 to 2005, and as Eden Capwell on  Santa Barbara from 1984 to 1991.

Personal life

Walker was born in Paducah, Kentucky and traveled the world during her youth. She lived in Lancaster, California from 1975 to 1978 and attended Antelope Valley High School there.  After her junior year, she moved to Troy, Illinois and attended Triad High School where she was active in the drama club and graduated from there in 1979.

Marcy has one son, Taylor, from her third husband, Stephan Collins. In 1999, she married Doug Smith and goes by the name Marcy Smith in her private life.  At one point, she was romantically involved with former All My Children costar Michael E. Knight, who played Tad Martin on the show.  She was briefly engaged to actor Bronson Pinchot during the mid-1980s. From 1985 to 1987, she was married to actor Billy Warlock.

Acting background

In 1981, Walker was cast in her first acting job on a daytime serial as Liza Colby on the ABC Television soap opera, All My Children. (She had turned down an offer to join the cast of As the World Turns.)  She was honored with two Outstanding Supporting Actress Daytime Emmy nominations in 1983 and 1984. After a successful three-year run, she decided to leave the show for other opportunities. She was replaced promptly with actress Alice Haining, as Liza Colby on the show.

In 1984, Walker created another popular soap opera role in the form of Eden Capwell on Santa Barbara. Her character, partnered with A Martinez's character, Cruz Castillo, became one of the period's most popular supercouples. For this role, Walker received three more Daytime Emmy nominations, this time in the category of Outstanding Lead Actress. She won the award in 1989 for an emotional storyline in which her character was brutally beaten and raped. She left the show in 1991.

In 1993, she started playing the role of Tangie Hill on Guiding Light. While the role was created specifically for Walker, the character didn't catch on with the audience and  Walker declined to renew her contract. Walker left the show in mid-1995 before making a long-awaited comeback appearance as Liza Colby on All My Children in September of that year. In 2001, she was nominated for another Outstanding Lead Actress Daytime Emmy award.

On August 5, 2004, The Wilton Bulletin, a Connecticut newspaper, reported Walker's intention to become a full-time children's ministry director at Hope Church in Wilton, Connecticut upon the expiration of her ABC Television contract the following September.  The actress had been interviewed for the article on July 20, 2004.  On August 20, 2004, Dan J Kroll of soapcentral.com reported that Walker's All My Children contract had not been renewed.  Her farewell appearance on All My Children aired on September 28, 2004.

The exit of Liza Colby occurred amid rumor that Walker would return to the show on a recurring basis. This rumor was fueled by the fact that her exit was very open-ended. She was not killed off, like some notable fan favorites like Jesse Hubbard, played by Darnell Williams, but rather assumed a new identity. Her character simply decided to take her daughter to live out of reach from her controlling ex-husband Adam Chandler, played by David Canary.

According to Soap Opera Digest magazine, Walker was at first hesitant to go on a recurring basis, but later warmed to the idea. In December 2004, the writers created a scene where Liza appeared making a phone call. Walker appeared again in January 2005, when her character assisted Babe Carey Chandler and Jamie Martin, in their attempt to flee from Adam's wrath. The characters of Babe and Jamie were played by Alexa Havins and Justin Bruening.

Former head writer Megan McTavish spoke to the soap media and publicly thanked Walker for working without a contract, but also hinted that she did not intend for Liza to return to the show any time soon. However, in 2009, the character of Liza returned, albeit played this time by actress Jamie Luner.

After Walker left All My Children, she decided to accept a position in Christian ministry based in Huntersville, North Carolina.

In addition to her work with daytime soap operas, Walker has starred in several movies of the week, including The Return of Desperado, Bar Girls, Midnight's Child, and Terror In the Shadows.

Walker did not participate in the All My Children reunion that was featured on the February 2, 2017 edition of the Hallmark Channel's Home & Family show.  However, Home & Family did utilize footage of Walker with Michael E. Knight from the All My Children storyline where Knight's Tad Martin character had affairs with both Liza Colby and her mother Marian (played by Jennifer Bassey).

Filmography

Awards and honors

Ministry background

In early 2005, after juggling two roles, one as an actress and another working part-time in her home church, Hope Church, in Wilton, Connecticut, she decided to pursue Christian youth ministry on a full-time basis. In 2005, she began working at Lake Forest Church in Huntersville, North Carolina as their Director of Children's Ministry. On July 22, 2010, she announced on her Facebook page that she was resigning her position on staff with the church to take a position at another Charlotte-area church. The Mission Pastor of her former church once said "Marcy is the coolest."
In 2011, Marcy joined the staff of LifeChurch.tv at their Edmond, OK campus.

References

External
 
Biography of Marcy Walker

1961 births
Living people
American soap opera actresses
Daytime Emmy Award winners
Daytime Emmy Award for Outstanding Lead Actress in a Drama Series winners
Antelope Valley High School alumni
Actresses from Kentucky
People from Paducah, Kentucky
People from Huntersville, North Carolina
21st-century American women